Suregada lithoxyla is a species of plant in the family Euphorbiaceae. It is endemic to Tanzania.

References

Crotonoideae
Endemic flora of Tanzania
Vulnerable plants
Taxonomy articles created by Polbot